The Christelijke Hogeschool Ede (in English Christian University of Applied Sciences is added to the Dutch name; abbreviation remains CHE) is a Dutch vocational university, based in Ede in the central Netherlands. The CHE has a clear Christian basis: the Bible as norm and source of inspiration.

From 2004-2011 and in 2015, 2016 and 2017, the CHE was appointed for the eleventh time as the best university of applied sciences in the Netherlands.

Academics

Degrees 
All bachelor's degrees are accredited by the Accreditation Organisation of the Netherlands and Flanders (NVAO).
 Business Administration
 Human Resource Management
 Communication
 Journalism
 Social Work and Services
 Social Pedagogical Work
 Nursing
 Theology and Religion
 Religious Education
 Teacher education for primary education
 Information and communications technology (starting 2018)

International programs are available within social studies, communication studies, business studies, nursing, journalism, education and theology.

The CHE also provides services, such as media training, educational support, coaching tracks, research, organization advice programs, education for professionals or personal career counseling for non-students. This is known as CHE-Transfer and is mainly focused on markets related to the degree programs.

Academic year 
A bachelor programme requires four years of full-time study (240 credits). The academic year starts September 1 and finishes the next following year on August 31. The calendar year has four periods of academic activity, which end before the summer holiday in the month of July. During the summer holiday no formal instruction is given. At the end of August, students can catch up on the work that has yet to be completed and resit for exams. During each academic period of ten weeks, students visit classes the first six to seven weeks. The remaining weeks are used for other types of educational activities, including preparing for exams.

Course-structure: most modules require the attendance of classes. A module then consists of several hours of classroom teaching or work and a number of hours of self-study. In many modules, self-study is structured by so-called study tasks (for example, library work), mini-training and assessment. Students receive detailed printed requirements per module.

Grading 
Grading at the CHE:
10:   excellent
9:    very good
8:    good
7:    satisfactory (above average)
6:    sufficient
0-5:  failure

References

Buildings and structures in Ede, Netherlands
Education in Gelderland
Educational institutions established in 1994
1994 establishments in the Netherlands
Vocational universities in the Netherlands
Christian universities and colleges in the Netherlands